Venefica procera is an eel in the family Nettastomatidae (duckbill/witch eels). It was described by George Brown Goode and Tarleton Hoffman Bean in 1883, originally under the genus Nettastoma. It is a marine, deep water-dwelling eel which is known from the western central Atlantic Ocean, including North Carolina, USA, Suriname, the Gulf of Mexico and the Caribbean Sea.

References

Nettastomatidae
Fish described in 1883